Fang Wenquan (方文权), born in May 1969, is the founder and chairman of Tianda Group and Tianda Institute. He studied international relations at the University of Sydney and Tsinghua University. His public roles include co-chairman of the National Strategy Institute, Tsinghua University, a council member of the Chinese People's Institute of Foreign Affairs, a council member of the Sydney Symphony Orchestra, honorary chairman of the Australian Council of Chinese Organizations, and honorary chairman of the Australian Council for the Promotion of the Peaceful Reunification of China. He is actively involved with philanthropy, promoting the value of “Caring for a Better World” and contributing to community services, including donations for poverty relief, education and training, healthcare, scientific research and environmental protection, culture, and the arts.

The Tianda Group, established in 1993 by Fang, is a multinational investment holding company engaged in pharmaceutical and biotechnology, consumer goods, printing and packaging, creative and media, resources and the environment, property development, and financial services. It has set up its headquarters in Hong Kong. The Group is the controlling shareholder of Tianda Pharmaceuticals Limited (00455.HK).

The Tianda Institute is a Hong Kong-based non-profit think tank founded by Fang in 2005. Leveraging the competitive edge of Hong Kong as an international city, Tianda Institute aims to contribute to the revival of the Chinese nation, peace, and development of the world through explorations, discussions, and studies on global and Chinese development issues, raising new ideas, arguments, and theories to address economic and social development challenges. Tianda Institute and Tsinghua University co-established the National Strategy Institute at Tsinghua University.

References

University of Sydney alumni
Tsinghua University alumni
Shenzhen University alumni
Chinese company founders
Living people
1969 births
20th-century Chinese businesspeople
21st-century Chinese businesspeople